Kortas may refer to:

Kortaş, Ergani, village in Diyarbakır Province, Turkey
Ken Kortas (1942–2022), American football player

See also
Korta, village in Pali district, Rajasthan, India
Cortas (disambiguation)